Volleyball events were contested at the 1997 Summer Universiade in  the island of Sicily, Italy.

References
 Universiade volleyball medalists on HickokSports

U
1997 Summer Universiade
Volleyball at the Summer Universiade